Per Digerud (25 July 1933 – 13 August 1988) was a Norwegian cyclist. He was born in Oslo, and was the father of Geir Digerud. He competed at the 1960 Summer Olympics in the individual road race . He finished at 71. place. He won the Norwegian National Road Race Championship in 1960, 1961 and 1964. He won the also the National Timetrial Championship 1955 (30 km), 1957,58,61 and 1962 (50 Km), 1956 (100 Km) and  the National Team-Timetrial Championship in 1955 (30 Km),1957,58,62 (50 Km), 1953,55,56 (100 Km), 1954, 55,56,60,61,62 (170).

References

1933 births
1988 deaths
Cyclists from Oslo
Norwegian male cyclists
Olympic cyclists of Norway
Cyclists at the 1960 Summer Olympics